Prokhladny is a town in the  Kabardino-Balkarian Republic, Russia, located on the Malka River,  north of Nalchik. Population:

History
It was founded in 1765 by Zaporozhian Cossacks and served as a southern border outpost in the 19th century. Town status was granted to it in 1937.

Administrative and municipal status
Within the framework of administrative divisions, Prokhladny serves as the administrative center of Prokhladnensky District, even though it is not a part of it. As an administrative division, it is incorporated separately as the town of republic significance of Prokhladny—an administrative unit with the status equal to that of the districts. As a municipal division, the town of republic significance of Prokhladny is incorporated as Prokhladny Urban Okrug.

Demographics
In 2002, the population included:
Russians (79.1%)
Koreans (3.3%)
Kabardians (3.1%)
Ukrainians (2.5%)
Turks (1.8%)
Germans (1.5%)

Transportation
There is large railway station in the town.

References

Notes

Sources

External links
Official website of Prokhladny 
Unofficial website of Prokhladny 
Another unofficial website of Prokhladny 

Cities and towns in Kabardino-Balkaria
Resorts in Russia